Confidentially Yours (known as Finally, Sunday! in other English-speaking markets) is a 1983 French comedy mystery film directed by François Truffaut. Based on the 1962 novel The Long Saturday Night by American author Charles Williams, it tells the story of Julien Vercel (Jean-Louis Trintignant), an estate agent who is suspected of murdering his wife and her lover. As Vercel is hidden in his office, his secretary Barbara Becker (Fanny Ardant) investigates these suspicious murders. It was the last film directed by Truffaut before his death in October of the following year. The film had a total of 1,176,425 admissions in France and was the 39th highest-grossing film of the year.

Plot
Julien Vercel, a real estate agent in the south of France, is hunting for ducks by the lake, while a man named Massoulier, who hunts in the same area, is shot dead. Julien returns to his office unaware but is soon questioned by the police. He learns that he is the main suspect, because when he left the hunt, he saw Massoulier's parked car, turned its lights off to save the battery and closed one of the door upon which he left fingerprints. Furthermore, the deceased Massoulier and Julien's wife, Marie-Christine had a secret relationship. When he confronts his wife later at home, she nonchalantly confirms her adultery. While Marie-Christine hides, Julien is taken to the police station for a second interview but is released with the help of his lawyer, Clement who drives him home. In the meantime, Marie-Christine has been murdered. Julien is now the prime suspect. In an effort to prove his innocence he wants to go to Nice, where his wife previously worked, but his secretary, Barbara Becker, argues that she should do the research on his behalf. She does so cunningly when her boss falls asleep in the office. Barbara is secretly in love with her boss, whereas Julien seems to have been indifferent to her.

While Julien hides in his real estate office instead of surrendering to the police, Barbara, who travels to Nice, starts investigating the past life of Marie-Christine.  She learns that Marie-Christine's real name was Josiane Kerbel, that she has been married to a gambler, and that she lost a great deal of money gambling on horses. She married Vercel only to avoid drowning in debts. The tracks lead Barbara and Julien to a movie theater, then to a night club, and from there to the dark labyrinths of the prostitution area. Barbara and Julien mistakenly assault a suspicious man, believing him to be the real killer. It is revealed that he is, in fact, Massoulier’s brother. At the theater, a box office clerk, former lover of Massoulier, who viciously accused Julien of murder on the phone, is stabbed to death. Barbara, at her wit’s end, goes to see Julien’s lawyer and finally find the truth : Clement and Marie-Christine were lovers. He killed Massoulier because Marie-Christine asked him to, he killed her because she did not wanted to divorce Julien, he killed the clerk because she knew everything and he would have killed Julien after that.
Barbara and a savvy police officer work together to set a trap for the lawyer. Clement, who smells the trap based on the sound recording at the last minute, commits suicide in a phone booth after having admitted everything on the phone, when he sees the approaching cops. Julien and Barbara finally get married by Massoulier's brother who is a clergyman.

Cast

Awards and nominations

References

External links
 
 
 
 
 

1983 films
1983 comedy films
1983 crime films
1983 thriller films
1980s comedy mystery films
1980s comedy thriller films
1980s crime comedy films
1980s crime thriller films
1980s French-language films
1980s mystery thriller films
1980s psychological thriller films
Films directed by François Truffaut
Films based on American thriller novels
Films scored by Georges Delerue
Films with screenplays by François Truffaut
French comedy mystery films
French comedy thriller films
French crime comedy films
French crime thriller films
French mystery thriller films
French psychological thriller films
1980s French films